Felipe Alejandro Salinas Gatica (born 12 May 1982) is a Chilean footballer. He played for Cobreloa, Unión San Felipe and other clubs.

Honours
San Luis de Quillota
 Tercera División de Chile (1): 2003

Unión La Calera
 Primera B (1): 2017

External links
 BDFA Profile 
 

1982 births
Living people
Chilean footballers
San Antonio Unido footballers
Cobreloa footballers
Unión San Felipe footballers
San Luis de Quillota footballers
Everton de Viña del Mar footballers
Chilean Primera División players
Primera B de Chile players
Association football defenders
People from Quillota